The Chicago Northwestern Depot in De Smet, South Dakota was built by the Chicago and Northwestern Railroad (C&NW). It began construction in June of 1905 and was finished in August 1906. The depot is consistent with other small depots built during the early 1900's with its hip roof, red horizontal wood siding, trackside bay window and floor plan. Limestone blocks from Lime Siding, Minnesota, serve as the building's foundation. The depot features two waiting rooms, one for the men and one for the women, separated by the agent's office as well as a freight portion on one end.

The depot was listed in the National Register of Historic Places because of its architecture and also because of its association with the development of De Smet. Passenger service ceased with the end of the Dakota 400 in 1960. Today, the former depot serves as a museum.

References
Gerloff, Scott. Chicago Northwestern Railroad Depot at De Smet National Register of Historic Places Registration Form, National Park Service, Washington, DC, 1975.

Railway stations on the National Register of Historic Places in South Dakota
De Smet, South Dakota
Railway stations in the United States opened in 1906
Transportation in Kingsbury County, South Dakota
National Register of Historic Places in Kingsbury County, South Dakota
Railway stations closed in 1960
Former railway stations in South Dakota